Al Rinker (December 20, 1907 – June 11, 1982) was an American musician who began his career as a teen performing with Bing Crosby in the early 1920s in Spokane, Washington. In 1925 the pair moved to Los Angeles, eventually forming the Rhythm Boys trio with Harry Barris.

Biography
Barris wrote the songs "Mississippi Mud", "I Surrender, Dear", and "Wrap Your Troubles in Dreams". The singing group worked with Paul Whiteman's Big Band for three years. They went out on their own for a year until Crosby effectively dissolved the group to go solo.

The Rhythm Boys were filmed for the movie King of Jazz (1930) singing "Mississippi Mud", "So the Bluebirds and the Blackbirds Got Together", "A Bench in the Park", and "Happy Feet". According to a filmed interview of Rinker, Crosby performed the first two weeks on his first film while on daytime work release from jail after crashing his car into a telephone pole while driving drunk. After the Rhythm Boys broke up, they reunited once on the Paul Whiteman Presents radio broadcast on July 4, 1943.

In 1952, a song for which Rinker wrote the music with lyrics by Floyd Huddleston, "You Can't Do Wrong Doin' Right", appeared in the films Push-Button Kitty and The Affairs of Dobie Gillis. "You Can't Do Wrong Doin' Right" also previously appeared in the 1950 film Duchess Of Idaho. He also wrote the song "Everybody Wants to Be a Cat" also with Floyd Huddleston for the Disney animated children's movie The Aristocats (1970).

Rinker was born in Tekoa, Washington; his mother, Josephine, was an enrolled member of the Coeur d'Alene Tribe and a devout Roman Catholic. He and his siblings grew up on the Coeur d'Alene Reservation near De Smet, Idaho.

Their father, Charles, played fiddle and called square dances, and their mother played piano every evening after supper. His younger brother Charles Rinker became a lyricist who worked frequently with composer Gene de Paul. Rinker married Elizabeth Neuberger on October 25, 1938.

Their older sister Mildred, under her married name of Mildred Bailey, had embarked on a musical career in Los Angeles before Rinker and Crosby became known. She became a well-known jazz singer after the Rhythm Boys arranged for Paul Whiteman to "discover" her singing at a party; he hired her to sing with his band. For a time she was known as "Mrs. Swing."

References

Sources
Donald Shepherd and Robert F. Slatzer, Bing Crosby: The Hollow Man (New York: St. Martin's Press, 1981),

External links
 
 

1907 births
1982 deaths
American jazz singers
American lyricists
20th-century American singers
Bing Crosby
Coeur d'Alene people
American Roman Catholics
People from Tekoa, Washington
Jazz musicians from Washington (state)